Magic words are often nonsense phrases used in fantasy fiction or by stage magicians. Frequently such words are presented as being part of a divine, adamic, or other secret or empowered language. Certain comic book heroes use magic words to activate their powers. Magic words are also used as Easter eggs or cheats in computer games, other software, and operating systems. (For example, the words xyzzy, plugh, and plover were magic words in the classic computer adventure game Colossal Cave Adventure.)

Invocations of magic
Examples of traditional and modern magic words include:
Abracadabra – magic word used by magicians.
Ajji Majji la Tarajji – Iranian magic word (Persian).
Alakazam – a phrase used by magicians.
Hocus pocus – a phrase used by magicians.
Jantar Mantar Jadu Mantar – a phrase used by magicians in India.
Presto chango or Hey Presto – used by magicians (probably intended to suggest "quick change").

Magic words in fiction

Aajaye – used often by the clowns in Jaye's magic circus.
Ala Peanut Butter Sandwiches – used by The Amazing Mumford on Sesame Street.
Azarath Metrion Zinthos, used by Raven in the DC Comics series Teen Titans, its 2003 TV series and its cartoon spin-off Teen Titans Go!.
Bibbidi-Bobbidi-Boo – used by Cinderella'''s Fairy Godmother.Boom Zahramay, a saying used in the Nickelodeon preschool show Shimmer and Shine.By the Power of Grayskull, I HAVE THE POWER – used by the Prince Adam, of He-Man and the Masters of the Universe, to transform him into He-Man.Cei-u – used by the DC Comics superhero, Johnny Thunder, to summon his magical genie-like Thunderbolt.Fus Ro Dah – used as a shout by those with the voice in the Elder Scrolls video game series.Izzy wizzy, let's get busy – Used on The Sooty Show when using Sooty's magic wand.Hex! Hex! – used by Bibi Blocksberg in the popular German children's audio drama series, called Bibi Blocksberg and Bibi and Tina.Joshikazam – used by Josh Nichols, a character from the popular Nickelodeon show Drake & Josh.Klaatu barada nikto – A phrase used in the 1951 movie The Day the Earth Stood Still.  While not intended as magical words in that movie, they were used as such in the spoof horror movie Army of Darkness.Mecca lecca hi, mecca hiney ho – Jambi on Pee-wee's Playhouse.Meeska, Mooska, Mickey Mouse – used on the children's TV series Mickey Mouse Clubhouse to make the Clubhouse appear.Oo ee oo ah ah ting tang walla walla bing bang, phrase used in song "Witch Doctor" performed by Ross Bagdasarian Sr., and released in 1958 by Liberty Records under the stage name David Seville. Open sesame – used by the character Ali Baba in the English version of a tale from One Thousand and One Nights.Ostagazuzulum – used by the title character, Wizbit, in the British Children's TV series Wizbit.Sim Sala Bim – a phrase used by Harry August Jansen a.k.a. Dante The Magician, circa 1940. "Sim Sim Sala Bim" are the magic words said by Hadji on the shows The Adventures of Jonny Quest and The Real Adventures of Jonny Quest. The line was used by Oscar "Oz" Diggs in Oz the Great and Powerful.Shazam – used by the comic book hero Billy Batson to change into Captain Marvel.Hey, Shadow, remember who you are  - an incantation used by a Scientist in a movie The Shadow to return his lost shadow, who became to live its own life, to its proper place.Schwan, kleb an! (literally "Swan, hold fast") - a spell used by the Youngest Brother in the tale "The Magic Swan" in the collection of Ludwig Bechstein. This spell made the people, who touched his magic swan, stick to the latter.Shimbaree, Shimbarah, Shimbaree, Shimbarah – used on the children's video and TV series Barney and the Backyard Gang and Barney & Friends.Treguna Mekoides Trecorum Satis Dee – the spell for 'Substitutiary Locomotion' written on the Star of Astoroth in the movie Bedknobs and Broomsticks.Walla Walla Washington – Bugs Bunny in Looney Tunes.Wiggle Waggle – Greg Page in The Wiggles.

Craig Conley, a scholar of magic, writes that the magic words used by conjurers may originate from "pseudo-Latin phrases, nonsense syllables, or esoteric terms from religious antiquity", but that what they have in common is "language as an instrument of creation".

See also
Eight Magic Words, magic words in politics
IncantationKotodama''
Mantra

References

External links